Lucius Lyon (1800–1851), U.S. Senator from Michigan from 1837 to 1839. Senator Lyon may also refer to:

Bob Lyon (fl. 2000s), Kansas State Senate
Caleb Lyon (1822–1875), New York State Senate
Charles W. Lyon (1887–1960), California State Senate
Chittenden Lyon (1787–1842), Kentucky State Senate
Francis Strother Lyon (1800–1882), Alabama State Senate
Walter Lyon (Pennsylvania politician) (1853–1933), Pennsylvania State Senate

See also
Senator Lynn (disambiguation)
Senator Lyons (disambiguation)